Ujków Nowy Kolonia  is a village in the administrative district of Gmina Bolesław, within Olkusz County, Lesser Poland Voivodeship, in southern Poland. It counts about 650 people. It is being cut by the main interstate E40.

References

Villages in Olkusz County